Eirene may refer to:

 Eirene (artist), 1st-century Greek artist
 Eirene (daughter of Poseidon), in Greek mythology
 Eirene (genus), a genus of hydrozoans in the family Eirenidae
 Eirene (goddess), the Greek personification of peace
 Eirene (moon), a moon of Jupiter
 Eirene (Rome character)
 Eirene of Montferrat, Byzantine Empress consort
 Eirene Mort (1879–1977), Australian artist and writer
 Eirene White, Baroness White, (1909–1999), British politician

See also
 Irene (disambiguation)